Kasugai Station is the name of two train stations in Japan:

 Kasugai Station (JR Central)
 Kasugai Station (Meitetsu)